Hans Petter Lundgaard (born 15 May 1935) is a Norwegian jurist born in Oslo.

Career
He was employed as a university lector at the University of Oslo from 1963, and took over as leader of the Norwegian Bureau for Insurance Disputes in 1971. In 1973 the position of Norwegian Consumer Ombudsman was created. Inger Louise Valle held the position for many years, but while she was a member of the cabinet Nordli from 1976 to 1981 Lundgaard was acting Norwegian Consumer Ombudsman. Valle left in 1981, and Lundgaard got the job on a permanent basis. In 1986 he was appointed as a presiding judge (lagdommer) in the Eidsivating Court of Appeal, later moving to Borgarting. He retired in 2005.

References

1935 births
Living people
Ombudsmen in Norway
Directors of government agencies of Norway
Judges from Oslo
Academic staff of the University of Oslo